Race the Sun is a 1996 American comedy-drama film directed by Charles T. Kanganis and starring Halle Berry and James Belushi.  The plot is loosely based on the true story of the Konawaena High School Solar Car Team, which finished 18th in the 1990 World Solar Challenge and first place among high school entries.

Plot 

In Hawaii, Sandra Beecher arrives at Kona Pali High School for her first day as a teacher after the residing science teacher quit.  Upon arriving she instantly meets Frank Machi, the shop teacher, who orients her.  In her first class she meets several students.  These include Daniel Webster, a surfer and aspiring designer, Marco Quito, an outspoken and flashy cool kid, Gilbert Tutu, an overweight and shy, yet brilliant computer geek, Oni Nagano, a whiny valley girl of Japanese descent, Eduardo Braz, a young mechanic who is quick to defend his heritage and his friends from insults, and Luana Kanahele, Eduardo's girlfriend.  Sandra is quick to confess to her class that she doesn't science, but english, yet emphasizes that unlike the other teachers she intends to push them through their classes despite their self-declared "Lolo" (Stupid) status.

In a teacher's meeting, Sandra attempts unsuccessfully to raise awareness for the science fair that week since no students at Kona Pali are participating.  Her attempts are rebuffed due to a looming sense of hopelessness regarding what can be accomplished at the school.  Frank chides her and tells her that she will understand with time.  Daniel's design for an experimental surfboard is rejected by his boss at his job, unmotivatingly telling him to stick to the preset designs.  The next day, Sandra calls Daniel, Braz, Marco, Gilbert, Oni, and Luana.  The six being the only students to not offer a proposal for a science project so she requires them to attend the district science fair the following night in order to come up with ideas.

At the fair, a solar car model done by Sutcliffe Academy is showcased as being an entry for the upcoming Hawaiian inter-island solar car race.  Jack Fryman, marketing vice-president of Celtech Corporation and the father of Steve Fryman, one of the students involved, announces that the winner of that race will be admitted into the World Solar Challenge, a six-day race held in Australia.  Gilbert and Daniel express interest but they're rebuffed by the rest claiming it to be more of a "Haole" (Non-Local Hawaiian) affair.  When Daniel begins to admire the mini-model of the solar car, Steve instantly harasses him and tells him not to go near their car, calling him a Lolo in the process.  The other students arrive and Marco instantly begins to trade words with Steve, and Sandra attempts to defuse the situation by getting them to walk away.  Steve, however, directs one last sexually degrading comment towards Luana, which causes Braz to punch him.  Jack Fryman arrives and Steve claims that Braz attacked him for no reason, Jack then has security called to escort him out calling Braz an animal.

In Saturday detention, the six start talking once the teacher leaves.  The blame eventually landing on Daniel for their situation, and Braz instantly attacks Daniel calling him a Haole given what happened and how Daniel acted throughout.  Daniel tells Braz he is just as local as the rest of them, to which Braz proposes retaliating violently against the Sutcliffe team.  Daniel simply shows him a sketch for a solar car, as an alternative means of fighting back against what happened.  Once released from detention, the six students visit Sandra's home and show her the sketch as their proposal for the science project.  The six are determined to do it despite the race only being two months away, regardless of whether or not they receive credit for it since they want to get back at Sutcliffe.  Braz being the mechanic, Daniel being the designer and handler of fiber glass, Marco offering himself as the lead driver, Gilbert's computer knowledge is also employed while Luana is left to eventually think of a position with the team.  Oni then introduces Uni Kakamura, a math prodigy who is just as shy and soft-spoken as Gilbert as an addition to the team, and Daniel says he could bring someone else in.  Sandra eventually relents and agrees.

That night, Daniel talks to Cindy Johnson, his willful and rebellious stepsister and after a slight argument between them and Daniel's father, Cindy agrees to join them.  The team then starts to work on the car, yet Daniel's design proves to be too hard for them to manifest.  Sandra talks to Frank to ask for his help, but refuses by pointing out that the students are Lolos with no drive or higher aspirations beyond being low income, minimum wage workers.  Gilbert, however, refuses to give up on the project and refuses to get out of the skeleton of the car even after falling under his weight.  Frank tells Sandra that he would handle the situation, and simply tells him to stay in the car all the time he wants after she leaves.

The next morning Daniel wakes up to see a cockroach walking through his dresser and has an epiphany for a more ergonomic design.  Getting the team back together, they work and manage to build Daniel's second design in time for the race and name it "Cockroach".  At a teacher's meeting not far from the race, Sandra states that if the Kona Pali team wins the inter-island race and goes to Australia they will need a male chaperone.  Frank is given the chance and signs the paper after some goading by Sandra.

The day of the race, Daniel has the sudden idea to put in an extra battery in the car.  Daniel being a surfer is capable of predicting sky conditions, and claims that the sky will cloud over that afternoon.  Due to that strategy, the Kona Pali team is able to outperform everyone else and barely qualify by completing the required hundred laps, defeating Sutcliffe Academy and a resentful Steve in the process.

Jack Fryman attempts to have the Cockroach rebuilt and redesigned to have Celtech's solar panels after being pressured by his superiors, but the team refuses with Braz emphasizing that their car was built by "animals".  Arriving in Australia, the drivers are weighed in and Gilbert registers himself as an alternate.   The students are nearly demoralized when seeing the arrival of Hans Kooiman and the Euro Team as well as several other entries, but are reassured that they are here to race like everyone else.  The night before the first day, Sandra announces that a captain must be chosen and Daniel is nominated due to the double battery idea that got them there.

On the first day the Cockroach suffers a busted ball joint.  Jack Fryman tells them to either fix the car or leave the race, Frank threatens Jack not to interfere again.  The team eventually manages to repair the car, but fall greatly behind as a result.  When reaching their camping stop for the night, they're told not to despair since the highway can play tricks and even the odds.  On the second day things go smoothly until a sand storm hits that damages several cars, but the cockroach and Cindy survive intact.  That night, Frank tells Sandra that he made it to Kona Pali because of Gilbert.  Gilbert's father, John Francis Tutu, was a machinist on the USS Clark where a 22 year-old Frank was also stationed.  One day an oxygen tank blew up and killed four men, including Gilbert's father who jumped in front of Frank to save his life.

On the third day they arrive at the halfway point of the race, interrupting Hans Kooiman's interview.  Upon arriving, Luana is named their spokeswoman.  That night at the hotel, Marco mocks Gilbert for being a registered driver, and Cindy tells Uni that she should be more assertive against Oni, who tends to boss her around.  Later on at a reception dinner, Marco and Oni dance with the local Australians while Sandra and Frank have dinner and talk about their respective divorces before being brought onto the dance floor by Marco and Oni respectively.  Gilbert and Uni look on and decide they don't want to dance, with a mutual attraction growing between them.  As Braz and Luana walk through the nearby streets, they see Jack talking to Daniel, having approached him moments earlier in an attempt to persuade him and the team to drop out of the race.  Moments later, Daniel sees Cindy on a bike while drinking from a flask.

On the fourth day Cindy can't drive well due to the hangover, and is disqualified from driving for the rest of the race for drinking while in a school sponsored event.  Daniel reveals himself to be the one who looked through her belongings and exposed her.  Cindy runs off to be alone and Daniel follows her and tries to talk some sense into her, but she rejects him.  On the fifth day Oni suffers from a fever and is rendered unable to continue.  Marco then goes head to head with Hans Kooiman and are both barely missed by two road trains.  When Daniel tries to apologize, Hans is hostile.  Braz tries to defuse the situation and Hans spits at him in an attempt to instigate a fight but Braz restrains himself.  Braz then attacks Daniel, claiming to be the one having to fight his fights after he screws up and revealing that he saw him talking to Jack and accuses him of trying to sabotage them on purpose and once more calling him a Haole.  Daniel then resigns as captain and gives Braz the position.  That night the atmosphere among them all is deathly quiet, with Braz quietly voicing his fears and concerns to Luana.

On the final day, Marco also suffers from the heat and becomes delirious while in the car causing it to swerve onto the dry sand as Hans and his team pass them.  Uni being the only one left takes the wheel while the rest follow her.  The Cockroach suffers an electrical fire, however, and swerves off of the road onto the edge of a small cliff.  Daniel and Braz try to save her together, but Gilbert simply comes and smashes the windshield to get her out while Frank puts the fire out.  While checking the gauges, Braz determines that the car still runs and can therefore still make it.  Frank claims they're out of drivers, but Gilbert offers himself showing that he is registered with Marco's confirmation.  Frank tells him that the car won't move with him inside and then goes on to tell the students that because of their efforts in this race being the first high school team to ever enter it that they can never be called Lolos again.  Daniel responds by saying that in his own eyes he will always be a Lolo if they quit now, which is what's expected of them.  Daniel then theorizes that the car will walk with Gilbert driving it if the solar panels are dropped, Braz and Daniel put their differences aside and Braz tells Daniel to lead them.

Hans' solar car is stuck in a ditch as Gilbert slowly passes him and the Euro team.  Gilbert drives with cheers and encouragement from the rest of the team but begins to doubt himself when approaching a hill before the finish line.  The Cockroach crawls and the rest of the team runs to his side to keep him from giving in, with Uni finally standing up to Oni as Hans passes them smugly.  Through their encouragement, Gilbert is finally able to pass over the hill and Marco gets on the back of the Cockroach to coach him as they gain momentum and catch up to Hans.  Eventually using a maneuver to cause Hans' car to flip over on momentum, the Kona Pali team is cleared to finish in third place, much to Jack Fryman's dismay.  Not long before reaching however, the wheels detach under the weight and strain.  Gilbert and Marco are left dragging towards the finish line as the audience rises to its feet in anticipation.  The Cockroach barely arrives and crosses the finish line, officially finishing the race.  Both the team and the Kona Pali community watching from Hawaii celebrate the victory, with Gilbert and Uni kissing as well as Oni kissing Marco.  Daniel and Cindy put aside their differences and refers to herself as Daniel's sister.

Cast 

 Halle Berry as Sandra Beecher
 James Belushi as Frank Machi
 Bill Hunter as Commissioner Hawkes
 Casey Affleck as Daniel Webster
 Eliza Dushku as Cindy Johnson
 Kevin Tighe as Jack Fryman
 Anthony Ruivivar as Eduardo Braz
 J. Moki Cho as Gilbert Tutu
 Dion Basco as Marco Quito
 Sara Tanaka as Uni Kakamura
 Nadja Pionilla as Oni Nagano
 Adriane Napualani Uganiza as Luana Kanahele
 Steve Zahn as Hans Kooiman
 Robert Hughes as Judd Potter
 Jeff Truman as Ed Webster
 Joel Edgerton as Steve Fryman

Production 
The film was written and co-produced by Barry Morrow, who had shared the 1988 Academy Award for Writing Original Screenplay for Rain Man. The story was based on the solar car team from Konawaena High School, which finished 18th overall in the 1990 World Solar Challenge and first place among high school entries, and was the first high school team to finish the Challenge.

Reception 
Stephen Holden of The New York Times said the "movie doesn't waste time admiring the technology at the expense of human drama, of which there is plenty, none of it overblown". Peter Stack of the San Francisco Chronicle compared Race the Sun to Cool Runnings for solar cars, saying it "boasts not only the lively spectacle of the race but also the kids learning to set aside their differences and insecurities to bond as a team. It's not a soaring, transcendent film experience – mostly it's corny and predictable. But it has a certain sunny charm and a few winning gags to keep it in the winning column." Carole Glines of Box Office Magazine also mentions the film's predictability, saying the student characters "all receive about a minute of screen time for character development as the plot paces through its predictable course." Hollis Chacona of the Austin Chronicle said "you might as well call this movie Hot Runnings", and notes that J. Moki Cho's character Gilbert gives this film substance and a "sweet quality that makes it easier to swallow than you might expect".

The film grossed $1.1 million on its opening weekend and grossed a total of $1.9 million in the U.S.

See also 
Cinema of Australia

References

External links 
 
 

1996 films
1996 comedy-drama films
American auto racing films
Films about educators
American films based on actual events
Films scored by Graeme Revell
Films directed by Charles T. Kanganis
Films set in Hawaii
Films set in the Northern Territory
Films set in South Australia
Films shot in Australia
Films shot in Hawaii
Solar car racing
TriStar Pictures films
1990s English-language films
1990s American films